The 1980 Japan Series was the 31st edition of Nippon Professional Baseball's postseason championship series. It matched the Central League champion Hiroshima Toyo Carp against the Pacific League champion Kintetsu Buffaloes. The Carp defeated the Buffaloes in seven games to capture their second consecutive Japan Series championship.

Summary

See also
1980 World Series

References

Japan Series
Hiroshima Toyo Carp
Osaka Kintetsu Buffaloes
Japan Series
Japan Series
Japan Series
Japan Series